The United States Department of Energy complex is one of two administrative complexes of the United States Department of Energy.  It is located at 19901 Germantown Road in Germantown, Maryland, on a campus originally developed in the 1950s as the headquarters of the Atomic Energy Commission.  The complex's original five buildings were designed by the New York City architectural firm Voorhees, Walker, Smith & Smith, a firm prominent in the development of laboratories and associated facilities.  It was sited at what was believed to a distance far enough from Washington, DC to survive a nuclear blast on that city.

The complex was listed on the National Register of Historic Places in 2016.

See also
National Register of Historic Places listings in Montgomery County, Maryland

References

Government buildings on the National Register of Historic Places in Maryland
Buildings and structures in Montgomery County, Maryland
National Register of Historic Places in Montgomery County, Maryland
Germantown, Maryland
United States Department of Energy facilities
United States Atomic Energy Commission